Below are the squads for the 2010 AFF Championship, co-hosted by Indonesia and Vietnam, which took place between 1 and 29 December 2010. Table below lists the player's total caps, their club teams and their age on the tournament's opening day.

Group A

Indonesia
Coach:  Alfred Riedl

* Budi Sudarsono withdrew injured

Thailand
Coach:  Bryan Robson

Malaysia
Coach: K. Rajagopal

Laos
Coach:  David Booth

Group B

Vietnam
Coach:  Henrique Calisto

Singapore
Coach:  Radojko Avramović

Myanmar
Coach: Tin Myint Aung

Philippines
Coach:  Simon McMenemy

References

 "ประกาศรายชื่อนักฟุตบอลทีมชาติไทย AFF Suzuki Cup 2010". (in Thai). FAT.or.th. Football Association of Thailand. 26 November 2010. Retrieved 29 November 2010.
 "Raddy announces final squad of 22 for AFF Suzuki Cup". FAS.org.sg. Football Association of Singapore. 27 November 2010. Retrieved 29 November 2010.
 "ဆူဇူကီး ဖလား ၿပိဳင္ပြဲ၀င္မည့္ ျမန္မာ့ လက္ေရြးစင္ ၂၂ဦး အၿပီးသတ္ လူစာရင္း ထြက္ေပၚလာ". (in Burmese). Soccer Myanmar. 23 November 2010. Retrieved 29 November 2010.
 "Pressure is off for Malaysia". AFF Suzuki Cup official website. 29 November 2010. Retrieved 30 November 2010.
 "Laos – Squad". Goal.com. Retrieved 1 December 2010.
 "Indonesia – Squad". Goal.com. Retrieved 1 December 2010.

AFF Championship squads
2010 AFF Championship